Dulcedo is a Neotropical butterfly genus from the subfamily Satyrinae in the family Nymphalidae. The genus is monotypic: its sole species is Dulcedo polita, which occurs from Nicaragua to Colombia.

References

Haeterini
Nymphalidae of South America
Monotypic butterfly genera